The 1937 Albanian National Championship was the seventh season of the Albanian National Championship, the top professional league for association football clubs, since its establishment in 1930.

Overview
It was contested by 10 teams, and KF Tirana won the championship.

League standings

Results

References
Albania - List of final tables (RSSSF)

Kategoria Superiore seasons
1
Albania
Albania